WHAS may refer to:

 WHAS (AM), a radio station (840 AM) licensed to Louisville, Kentucky, United States
 WHAS-TV, a television station (channel 11 analog/55 digital) licensed to Louisville, Kentucky, United States
 Wet Hot American Summer, a 2001 film